"Cry Thunder" is a song by English power metal band DragonForce. It was released as the second single from their fifth album The Power Within. Its music video was released in Spring 2012.  So far "Cry Thunder" is DragonForce's most popular song with vocalist Marc Hudson.

Lyrics
The lyrics are standard lyrics for the band: battle in a far-off land similar to "Through the Fire and Flames" and "Heroes of Our Time," an epic battle between Heaven and Hell.

References

DragonForce songs
2012 singles
2012 songs
Power metal songs
Songs written by Sam Totman
Roadrunner Records singles
Songs written by Herman Li